The Lotus 64 was a four-wheel drive racing car built by Lotus for the 1969 Indianapolis 500.

After the Lotus 29, Lotus 34, Lotus 38 and Lotus 56, The 64 was the fifth and final race car Colin Chapman built for USAC category racing. The United States Automobile Club had decided in the spring of 1969 that turbines and four-wheel drive would be banned in the USAC racing series.

Because the 56 had a gas turbine, Lotus decided to build a new car. The project was funded by Ford who supplied a V8 turbo engine, and by STP. Andy Granatelli, Chief Executive Officer of STP and the racing team owner, had arranged the deal. Of the three 64s built, Mario Andretti would drive the STP car, Graham Hill and Jochen Rindt the two factory cars that were painted in the colours of the sponsor.

Maurice Philippe carried over as much as possible from the Lotus 56 to the 64. The long monocoque and the suspension was used in the new car. The biggest difference was the engine. Because the 2.6-litre turbocharged Ford engine contributed more than 700 horsepower, a new gearbox was developed.

All three cars took part in practice, but Andretti had a serious accident and destroyed his 64 completely. The accident was triggered by an overheated wheel hub. Since this overheating also occurred in the two factory cars, the vehicles were withdrawn, despite setting fast practice times.

The cars were shipped to England and never used in a race. Almost forty years after their construction, a  restored Lotus 64 appeared at the Goodwood Festival of Speed In 2008.

References

American Championship racing cars
64